2018 Thai League 3 Upper Region is the 2nd season of the Thai football league. It is a part of the Thai League 3 and the feeder league for the Thai League 2. A total of 14 teams will compete in the league this season, after Amnat United and Phayao withdrew before the season started.

Changes from Last Season

Team changes

Promoted Clubs

Three clubs were promoted from the 2017 Thai League 4
 JL Chiangmai United
 Chiangrai City
 Marines Eureka
 Muangkan United

Two clubs were promoted to the 2018 Thai League 2
 Khonkaen
 Udon Thani

Relegated Clubs

A club was relegated to the 2018 Thai League 4 Northern Region
 Singburi Bangrajun

A club was relegated from the 2017 Thai League 2 
 Bangkok

Withdrawn Clubs
 Amnat United and Phayao were taking a 2-years break. This team is automatically banned 2 years, don't get subsidy and relegated to 2020 Thai League 4 Northern Region for Phayao, 2020 Thai League 4 North Eastern Region for Amnat United.

Teams

Stadium and locations

Foreign players

A T3 team could registered five foreign players by at least one player from AFC member countries and at least one player from ASEAN member countries. A team can use four foreign players on the field in each game, including at least one player from the AFC member countries or ASEAN member countries (3+1).
Note :: players who released during summer transfer window;: players who registered during summer transfer window;↔: players who have dual nationality by half-caste or naturalization.

League table

Positions by round

Results by round

Results

Season statistics

Top scorers
As of 25 August 2018.

Hat-tricks

Attendance

Attendance by home match played

Source: Thai League 3

See also
 2018 Thai League
 2018 Thai League 2
 2018 Thai League 3
 2018 Thai League 4
 2018 Thai FA Cup
 2018 Thai League Cup
 2018 Thai League 3 Lower Region

References

 Club licensing document passed

External links
Thai League 3
thailandsusu.com
smmsport.com

Thai League 3
2018 in Thai football leagues